Mostafaabad (also Romanized as Moşţafáābād) is a village in Lar Rural District, Laran District, Shahrekord County, Chaharmahal and Bakhtiari Province, Iran. At the 2006 census, its population was 2,257, in 588 families. The village is populated by Persians.

References 

Populated places in Shahr-e Kord County